Nisporeni is a district in west-central Moldova, with its administrative center at Nisporeni.
According to the 2014 census, its population was 53,154; most (82.8 percent) are Moldovans.

History
The Vărzărești monastery was first mentioned on 25 April 1420. The oldest locations in the district (Bălăurești, Ciutești, Seliște, Nisporeni and Vărzărești) were first mentioned in 1420-1425. The 15th to 18th centuries were marked by economic (trade and agriculture) and cultural development (the construction of monasteries and churches) and population growth. The city of Nisporeni was first mentioned by Gaspar Graziani in his book dated 4 January 1618. According to Graziani, at that time Nisporeni was ruled by Farima Nicolae II, descendant of the Farima dynasty and cousin of Michael the Brave. Nicolae II is one of Moldova's national heroes. Local people were primarily involved in farming (grapes and other fruit) and hunting. In 1812, after the Russo-Turkish War (1806-1812), the Russian Empire occupied Basarabia; during the period 1812–1917, there was an intense russification of the native population. In 1918, after the collapse of the Russian Empire, Bessarabia united with Romania; during this period (1918–1940, 1941–1944), Nisporeni District was part of Chisinau County. After the 1940 Molotov-Ribbentrop Treaty, Basarabia was occupied by the USSR. In 1991, as a result of the independence of Moldova, Nisporeni District became part of Ungheni County (1991–2003); in 2003, it became a separate administrative unit.

Geography
Nisporeni District is located in the central part of the Republic of Moldova. It is bordered by Ungheni District on the northwest, Calarasi District on the northeast, Straseni District on the east, Hincesti District on the south, and Romania on the Prut River. The district is in the central part of the Moldavian Plateau. Nisporeni District is situated on the highest part of the plateau, encompassing the Codri forest. The terrain has been called "Basarabian Switzerland." Paradoxically, the forested Codri is most prone to erosion and landslides.

Climate
Nisporeni District, in common with the republic, has a temperate continental climate with mild, short winters and warm, long summers. On average, there are 2,195 hours of sunshine in central Moldova. Sunshine ranges from 43–65 hours in December to 300–340 hours in July. Monthly temperatures are above the annual average from March to November and below from December to February. Fall rains are highly variable.

Fauna
Fauna is typical of that found in European forests and includes fox, deer, red deer, spotted deer, badger, wild boar, raccoon dog, wolf and wildcats. Birds include hawk, owl, cuckoo, eagle and stork.

Flora
Forests occupy 34 percent of the district and include oak, beech, hornbeam, English oak, linden, maple and locust. Wildflowers include clover, knotweed, nettle, bellflower and fescue.

Rivers
The Prut, which crosses the district in the west, borders Romania; its principal tributaries are the Nîrnova and the Lăpușna. The Cogâlnic River, which flows into the Black Sea, rises in the district.

Administrative subdivisions
Localities: 39
Administrative center: Nisporeni
City: Nisporeni
Villages: 16
Communes: 22

Demographics

As of 1 January 2012 the district population was 66,600, of which 21.8 percent was urban and 78.2 percent rural.

Births (2010): 744 (11.1 per 1000)
Deaths (2010): 884 (13.2 per 1000)
Growth rate (2010): -140 (-2.1 per 1000)

Ethnic groups 

Footnote: * There is an ongoing controversy regarding the ethnic identification of Moldovans and Romanians.

Religion 
Christians - 99.4%
Orthodox Christians - 98.8%
Protestant - 0.6%
Baptists - 0.2%
Pentecostals - 0.2%
Seventh-day Adventists - 0.1%
Evangelicals - 0.1%
Other - 0.5%
No religion 0.1%

Economy
The district has a total of 21,956 registered businesses. Agricultural land comprises , 61.5 percent of total land area. Land in production makes up  (34.5 percent of total land area) as follows:
Orchards:  (6.3 percent)
Vineyards:  (9.7 percent)
Pasture:   (10.8 percent)

Principal crops include grapes, cereals (wheat and oats), orchards (peach, apple and plum), sunflowers and rapeseed.

Education
There are 36 educational institutions in the district with a total student population of 9,300 (including 350 graduate-level students). The total number of teachers is 731, with 144 at the graduate level.

Politics
Centre-right political parties, particularly the AEI, are popular in the district; conversely, the PCRM has the lowest popularity of any Moldovan district. During the last three elections, the AEI vote increased by 74.5 percent.

Elections

|-
!style="background-color:#E9E9E9" align=center colspan="2" valign=center|Party
!style="background-color:#E9E9E9" align=right|Votes
!style="background-color:#E9E9E9" align=right|%
!style="background-color:#E9E9E9" align=right|+/−
|-
| 
|align=left|Liberal Democratic Party of Moldova
|align="right"|10,489
|align="right"|37.22
|align="right"|+14.46
|-
| 
|align=left|Party of Communists of the Republic of Moldova
|align="right"|5,352
|align="right"|18.99
|align="right"|−8.19
|-
| 
|align=left|Democratic Party of Moldova
|align="right"|5,292
|align="right"|18,78
|align="right"|+11.90
|-
| 
|align=left|Liberal Party
|align="right"|4,220
|align="right"|14.97
|align="right"|−12.04
|-
| 
|align=left|Party Alliance Our Moldova
|align="right"|1,192
|align="right"|4.23
|align="right"|−8.94
|-
|bgcolor=#0033cc|
|align=left|European Action Movement
|align="right"|702
|align="right"|2.49
|align="right"|+2.49
|-
|bgcolor="grey"|
|align=left|Other parties
|align="right"|942
|align="right"|3.32
|align="right"|+0.23
|-
|align=left style="background-color:#E9E9E9" colspan="2"|Total (turnout 60.63%)
|width="30" align="right" style="background-color:#E9E9E9"|28,386
|width="30" align="right" style="background-color:#E9E9E9"|100.00
|width="30" align="right" style="background-color:#E9E9E9"|

Culture
In the district are two museums, 112 art museums, 13 musical ensembles, 34 public libraries and 30 cultural centers.

Health
The district has a 200-bed general hospital. There are thirteen family-medicine offices, nine health centers and eight clinics. Nisporeni District has 73 doctors, 267 nurses and 240 auxiliary health-care workers.

See also
 Nisporeni District in Romanian Wikipedia

References

External links
 District site
 General description of Nisporeni district
 Population of district per year
 Results of 2010 Parliamentary election

 
Districts of Moldova